Scientology status by country describes the status of Scientology and its recognition as a religion in varying contexts or in different countries. The Church of Scientology pursues an extensive public relations campaign for state recognition of Scientology as a religion.

The Church of Scientology has been given tax exempt status in its home country, the United States, and has received recognition as a religion in various other countries such as Italy, Australia, Portugal and Spain; it thus enjoys and regularly cites the constitutional protection afforded in these nations to religious practice.

Some countries regard Scientology as a potentially dangerous cult, or do not consider local branches of the Church of Scientology to meet the legal criteria for being considered religion-supporting organizations, instead seeing Scientology as a business.

Across the world, countries view Scientology through their own legal frameworks, and status is not definitive. For example, in the United Kingdom — in 1999 the Charity Commission for England and Wales "concluded that the organisation was not established for charitable purposes or for public benefit and so could not be registered as a charity," and later in 2013 the UK Supreme Court held that a Church of Scientology could be a 'place of meeting for religious worship'. But without a formal definition of what constitutes 'religious worship', Scientology's status in that country remains unclear and unresolved.

Strategy 
The Church of Scientology's interest is to be recognized as a religion as well as a charitable organization. In an article titled "The Church of Scientology: Legitimacy through Perception Management", the lecturer Max Halupka observes "While a tax-exempt status is not a legal declaration of religious authenticity, the significance afforded the status by the public serves to color its true purpose. That is, to the public, tax-exemption denotes legal recognition and, thus, religious legitimacy." Using perception management, the Church of Scientology has sought legitimacy as a mainstream religion through public acceptance. Halupka continues, "From a marketing standpoint, such legal recognition could be utilized in combating the general perception of [the Church of Scientology's] cult status, which resulted, in large part, from criticisms of the religion's seemingly profit-driven purpose."

The United Kingdom in 2013 made reference to a 1983 judgment of the High Court of Australia concerning Scientology. The US State Department formally criticized Germany for discriminating against Scientologists in 1996, continued to pressure Germany, and it turned into a "diplomatic ruckus".

Status by country

Argentina 
No known recognition as a religion. As of 2012, it was officially recognised as a cult.

Australia 

The High Court of Australia has ruled that Scientology is a religion.

Austria 
Tax-exempt status as a charitable organization. It is not recognized as a religious association in Austria.

Belgium 

In 2005 Scientology's application for the status of a recognized religion was refused.

Brazil 
Not registered as a religion. Registered as a non-religious "private association" under CNPJ number 05.586.122/0001-25. The organization has the following registered activities: sound recording and music edition, book publishing, distribution of movies, videos and TV programs.

Canada 
The 1997 Freedom of religion and belief: a world report by the Human Rights Centre of the University of Essex stated that "the Church of Scientology has been recognised as a religion [in Canada] through several administrative decisions on matters such as tax exemption and authorisation to perform marriages." The Varsity, a student newspaper, reported in 2007 that the Church of Scientology's ministers can perform marriages in Canada and that Scientologist public servants are allowed to take time off work for Scientologist holidays. A 2008 article in the Torontoist stated that the Church does not have status as a federally registered charity for tax purposes. Religious scholars Douglas E. Cowan and David G. Bromley stated in a 2006 publication that "Scientology has yet to receive official recognition as a religion in Canada".

Chile 
As of 2009, Scientology had been considered a cult. The Constitution of Chile provides for freedom of religion, and a religious group in Chile may apply for legal public right status (comprehensive religious nonprofit status). As of 2012, Scientology did not have legal religious recognition.

China 
China recognises just five state-sanctioned religions, and Scientology is not one of them.

Colombia 
No known recognition.

Costa Rica 
Scientology was recognized as a religion in Costa Rica in 1991.

Croatia 
Croatia recognizes Scientology as a religion since 22 December 2003

Czech Republic 
Not registered as a religion (it is not recorded in the register of churches and religious societies). Dianetic centers are registered as associations.

Denmark 
In Denmark the Church of Scientology is not officially approved as a religion. It first applied for approval in the early 1970s; two further unsuccessful applications followed in 1976 and 1982. In mid-1997, the Church of Scientology filed a fourth application, which was suspended at their own request in 2000. In suspending their application, the Church asked the Ministry of Ecclesiastical Affairs to clarify the approval procedure. It was told that it must first submit an application before any feedback could be provided. Despite Scientology's unofficial status, the Church of Scientology maintains its European headquarters in Copenhagen.

Finland 
Scientology is not officially recognized as a religion in Finland. An application by the Church of Scientology to be registered as a religious body was denied by the Ministry of Education in 1998 on the grounds that "the known nature of the activities is not public worship in the sense meant by the law on freedom of religion". The denial was issued after the Church "had failed to comply with a request for more information".

France 

Since 1995, Scientology has sometimes been classified as a secte (cult), for instance in a report of the National Assembly of France. On this basis, a hostile stance is generally taken against the organization. In 2009, Scientology was fined the equivalent of almost US$900,000 upon conviction for fraud.

Germany 

The status of Scientology in Germany is unresolved. Two points are contested: firstly, whether or not the teachings of Scientology qualify as a religious or ideological teaching, and secondly, whether or not these teachings are only used as a pretext for purely commercial activity; if the latter were the case, this would most likely imply that Scientology would not qualify for protection as a religious or ideological community under Article 4 of the German constitution.

Greece 
Religious groups can gain recognition by becoming a "known religion" or by registering a "house of prayer" through relevant civil law provisions. Scientologists as of 2019 practice their faith through a registered non-profit civil-law organization and the weddings conducted by its members are not officially recognized. Scientology has faced serious litigation in the past. In the case Attiki Prefecture vs KEPHE, the practice of Scientology was ordered ended in Greece.  An appeal to the Athenian Court of Appeals ended with a reaffirmation of the verdict. The verdict was originally issued on December 20, 1995. It was not immediately put into effect. In January 1998 a Greek appeals court ordered Scientology's assets liquidated.

India 
According to a 2012 report, there is not a method of confirming the exact number of Scientologist in India, "but an estimated 6,000-7,000 individuals have taken various Scientology courses offered by the Delhi mission". An executive from the Church of Scientology in India claimed that there are now up to 30,000 members, based on a 2018 report. In February 2003, the Registrar of Companies of Delhi and Haryana registered the Religious Foundation of Scientology of New Delhi. In November 2003, the Director of Income Tax Exemptions for New Delhi granted the Scientology tax-exempt status. In 2004, the Religious Foundation of Scientology of Kolkata and Religious Foundation of Scientology of Mysore were likewise registered.

Indonesia 
Indonesian government legislation recognizes the "right of all religions to exist and function in society" and "the Church of Scientology has experienced no difficulties in gaining registration", but there has been no legal recognition as a religion.

Israel 
In January 1987 a parliamentary commission on cults, headed by MK Miriam Glazer-Ta'asa, declared Scientology a cult, although no further measures were taken. Its practice is legal.

Ireland, Republic of 
In Ireland, the Church of Scientology has not been successful in its attempts to obtain tax-free, charitable status.

Italy 
In terms of corporate status, the Italian Church of Scientology is one of Italy's non-profit and common-law associations; it has neither an intesa (recognition agreement with the Italian state), nor is it a recognized confessional community (ente di culto).

Some courts, including those in Rome and Turin, have viewed Scientology as a religion, although the Appeals Court of Milan did not do so during the criminal trial of various Scientologists. After it twice refused to recognize Scientology as a religion, its decisions were overturned by the Italian Supreme Court. In March 2000, the Italian Supreme Court upheld Scientology's religious status in Italy while reaffirming that Narconon is a non-tax-exempt for-profit business.

Japan 
The first Church of Scientology was opened in 2015 in Tokyo. However, Japan does not officially recognize Scientology as a religion.

Kazakhstan 
According to the U.S. State Department's 2008 International Religious Freedom Report, Scientologists are among many minority groups facing increasingly negative media coverage in Kazakhstan. During a press conference on April 10, 2008, a spokesperson for the Kazakh government's Procurator General's Office claimed that there were approximately 1,870 religious organizations in the country that presented a threat to national security and were engaged in destructive operations, citing Scientologists as one of the examples (these statements were later removed from the press conference transcript posted on the PGO website).

In 2008, parliament discussed new draft legislation which would severely restrict religious freedom. In February 2009, Interfax reported that Kazakh prosecutors were seeking liquidation of the Scientology Church in Karaganda. In a statement on its website, the Kazakh Prosecutor General's Office cited concerns over national security, as Scientologists' activity was aimed at undermining the "Kazakh nation's health through inflicting harm on people's psychic and physical health", and added that Scientologists were practising medicine outside medical institutions, and without the requisite education.

Kenya 
No known legal recognition

Kyrgyzstan 
The U.S. Department of State's 2005 Report on International Religious Freedom announced that the Church of Scientology had been registered as a religious group by the Kyrgyzstan State Commission on Religious Affairs.

North Macedonia 
In May 2017 Basic Court Skopje II approved the registration of the Church of Scientology of Macedonia, and the Home of Prayer religious group.

Mexico 
No known legal recognition as a religion.

Nepal 
No known legal recognition as a religion.

New Zealand 

No known legal recognition as a religion. The Church is recognised as a charitable organisation with tax-exempt status.

Netherlands 
After nine years of review, Scientology was recognized as a charitable organization (ANBI) on August 30, 2022.

Nicaragua 
Scientology is recognized as a minority religion in Nicaragua.

Norway 

Norway does not recognize the official Scientologikirken (Church of Scientology) as a religious community. It is registered as a non-profit. Although it is estimated that around 8000 people have taken scientology-related courses in Norway, the church only has around 100 active members. 
Scientologikirken has a history of settling legal cases out of court, although it was sentenced to refund 600,000 Norwegian kroner worth of course fees to a former member, in addition to the unsuccessful 6-year-long legal battle to grant it official status as a religion.

The church gained controversy in the high-profile case of Kaja Ballo's suicide. Ballo was the daughter of parliamentary minister Olav Gunnar Ballo.

Norwegians in general regard Scientologikirken as a cult.

Philippines 
The Philippines recognizes the Church of Scientology as a religious organization.

Poland 
Poland does not officially recognize Scientology as a religion.

Portugal 
The Portuguese Government officially recognized Scientology as a religion in November 2007.

Romania 
The Romanian Scientology Church has only 70 members. According to the Law no. 489/2006 Scientology is not included among the 18 officially recognized religions by the State.

Russia 

The Church has been subjected to considerable pressure from the state in Russia. In April 2007, the European Court of Human Rights ruled against Russia for repeatedly refusing to consider the Moscow Church of Scientology's application for the status of a legally valid religious association. The court found that the reasons given to deny re-registration of the church by the justice department and endorsed by the Moscow courts had no legal basis.

In July 2007, the St. Petersburg City Court ordered that the city's Scientology center be closed for violating its charter by engaging in unlicensed health care services. A court in Samara came to a similar decision in November 2008, closing down the activities of the local center for practicing without a license.

In September 2009, the European Court of Human Rights issued a binding ruling in favor of two Scientology branches in Surgut and Nizhnekamsk, which had been denied registration as "religious organizations". The two organizations were awarded €20,000 in costs and damages. The ruling, which cannot be appealed against, said that Russia could not ban the Church of Scientology simply because it did not have a long history in the country.

In 2010 some of the works of L. Ron Hubbard were included into the Federal List of banned extremist materials, and removed on 3 May 2011. Another such attempt was made by prosecutor in mid-2011 and was unsuccessful.

Slovenia 
According to a 2008 Le Monde report, Slovenia recognizes Scientology as a religion.

South Africa 
In 1975, Scientology was recognized as a non-profit organization in South Africa, despite the 1972 report of a formal government Commission of Inquiry that recommended otherwise. In December 2007, South Africa granted a certificate to the Church recognizing it as a "Public Benefit Organisation".

Spain 
On 31 October 2007 the National Court in Madrid issued a decision recognizing that the National Church of Scientology of Spain should be entered in the Registry of Religious Entities.

The administrative tribunal of Madrid's High Court ruled that a 2005 justice ministry decision to scrap Scientology from the register was "against the law". Responding to a petition filed by the church, the ruling said that no documents had been presented in court to demonstrate it was anything other than a religious entity.

Authorities had earlier declared that the government would not interfere in any way with the activities of the Church of Scientology.

Sweden 
On March 13, 2000, Scientology was registered as a "religious community".

Switzerland 
The Federal Council (Bundesrat) issued a written statement on 25 Nov 1996: "According to their nomenclature and their statutes, the Church of Scientology is viewed as a new religious movement, and is to be treated to the existence of other facts as such. The Federal Court shares this view."

In a final decision the Federal Court (Bundesgericht) of 14 Feb 1992 confirmed that the Church of Scientology is pursuing religious purposes and falls under the protection of freedom of faith, conscience and worship.

Taiwan 
In 2003, the National Ministry of the Interior for Taiwan recognized the Church of Scientology of Taiwan as a charitable religious institution, officially adding it to the rolls of the country's recognized religions. Taiwan has 15 Scientology missions and churches, including the one in Kaohsiung.

United Kingdom 

The Church of Scientology was not classified as a religious institution by the UK government until December 2013. The Church's application for charity status in England and Wales was rejected in 1999, and the Church has not exercised its right of appeal. However, in 2000, the Church of Scientology was exempted from UK value added tax on the basis that it is a not-for-profit body. The Ministry of Defence has confirmed that Scientology is "an officially recognised religion in the Royal Navy". The UK Prison Service does not recognize Scientology as a religion. Prisoners who are registered as Scientologists may practice their religion and are given access to a representative of the Church of Scientology if they wish to receive its ministry. In a December 2013 decision, the UK Supreme Court ruled unanimously that a London Church of Scientology chapel was a "place of meeting for religious worship" and should be registered as a place for marriage.  This judgement endorsed the Australian High Court decision of 1983 "Of the various attempts made to describe the characteristics of religion, I find most helpful that of Wilson and Deane". Under Scots law, Scientology ministers had been authorised to perform marriages in Scotland even prior to the December 2013 Supreme Court decision.

The UK government has openly criticized the Church in the past, as documented in 1971 in the Foster Report. The government places no restrictions upon its activities.

United States of America 

Since 1993, the Internal Revenue Service in the United States has formally recognized the Church of Scientology as a non profit entity for tax purposes.

Scientology as a religion

Scientology is officially recognized as a religion in the United States. Recognition came in 1993, when the Internal Revenue Service (IRS) stated that "[Scientology is] operated exclusively for religious and charitable purposes."

The New York Times noted in this connection that the Church of Scientology had funded a campaign which included a whistle-blower organization to publicly attack the IRS, as well as hiring of private investigators to look into the private lives of IRS officials. In 1991, Miscavige, the highest-ranking Scientology leader, arranged a meeting with Fred T. Goldberg Jr., the Commissioner of the Internal Revenue Service at the time. According to the Church of Scientology's version of events, the meeting was an opportunity for the organization to offer to end its long dispute with the IRS, including the dozens of suits brought against the agency, in exchange for the exemptions that Scientology believed it deserved. Goldberg's response was quite out of the ordinary: he created a special working group to resolve the dispute, bypassing the agency's exempt organizations division. The group met several times with the Scientology legal team and, according to an unnamed official quoted by the New York Times, "was persuaded that those involved in the Snow White crimes had been purged, that church money was devoted to tax-exempt purposes and that, with Mr. Hubbard's death, no one was getting rich from Scientology."

In August 1993, a settlement was reached; the organization would receive its tax-exempt status and end its legal actions against the IRS and its personnel. The organization was required only to resubmit new applications for exemption to the IRS Exempt Organizations (EO) division, which was told "not to consider any substantive matters" because those issues had been resolved by the committee. The secret agreement was announced on October 13, 1993, with the IRS refusing to disclose any of the terms or the reasoning behind the decision. Both the IRS and Scientology rejected any allegations that foul play or undue pressure had been used on IRS officials, insisting that the decision had been based on the merits of the case. IRS officials "insisted that Scientology's tactics had not affected the decision" and that "ultimately the decision was made on a legal basis". Miscavige claims that the IRS's examination of Scientology was the most exhaustive review of any non-profit organization in history.

Elsewhere, Scientology is recognized as a religion in Australia, Portugal, Spain, Slovenia, Sweden, Croatia, Hungary and Kyrgyzstan. In New Zealand, the Inland Revenue Department classified the Church of Scientology as a charitable organization and stated that its income would be tax exempt. Scientology officials have won the right to perform marriages in South Africa. In Italy, Scientology was judicially recognized as a religious denomination in 2000, when the Supreme Court held that Christian-based definitions of religion are not applicable because they would lead to the exclusion of Taoism, Buddhism, and many polytheistic, shamanistic, or animist religions.

Scientology is not recognized as a religion in Canada. In the UK, the Charity Commission for England and Wales ruled in 1999 that Scientology was not a religion and refused to register the organization as a charity, although a year later, it was recognized as a not-for-profit body in a separate proceeding by the UK Revenue and Customs and exempted from UK value added tax. In December 2013, the United Kingdom's highest court officially recognized Scientology as a religion. The ruling ended a five-year legal battle by Scientologist Louisa Hodkin, who sought the legal right to marry at the Church of Scientology chapel in central London. The opinion by five supreme court justices redefined religion in law, rendering the 1970 definition "out of date" in restricting religious worship to "reverence or veneration of God or of a Supreme Being".

In May 2008, the City of London police, senior officers of which had earlier received gifts worth thousands of pounds from the Scientology organization, unsuccessfully attempted to initiate a prosecution of a 15-year-old boy following a peaceful protest at which he held a sign reading "Scientology is not a religion, it is a dangerous cult". This statement is a quote from a superior court judgement against the Scientology organization. The summons was ostensibly issued under the Public Order Act 1986. The City of London police were swiftly instructed by the Crown Prosecution Service (CPS) that the word "cult" was "not abusive or insulting" to the Church of Scientology. The CPS advised the force on what action or behaviour at a demonstration might be considered to be threatening, abusive or insulting. The police force was then obliged to accept that their policing of future demonstrations will reflect this advice.

Scientology as a commercial enterprise

Scientology has been accused of being "a business, often given to criminal acts, and sometimes masquerading as a religion".

In conjunction with the Church of Scientology's request to be officially recognized as a religion in Germany, around 1996 the German state Baden-Württemberg conducted a thorough investigation of the group's activities within Germany. The results of this investigation indicated that at the time of publication, Scientology's main sources of revenue ("Haupteinnahmequellen der SO") were from course offerings and sales of their various publications. Course offerings ranged from (German Marks) DM 182.50 to about DM 30,000the equivalent today of approximately $119 to US$19,560. Revenue from monthly, bi-monthly, and other membership offerings could not be estimated in the report.

Since 1997 Germany has considered Scientology to be in conflict with the principles of the nation's constitution. It is seen as an anticonstitutional sect and a new version of political extremism and because there is "evidence for intentions against the free democratic basic order" it is observed by the Federal Office for the Protection of the Constitution. In 1997, an open letter to then-German Chancellor, Helmut Kohl, published as a newspaper advertisement in the International Herald Tribune, drew parallels between the "organized oppression" of Scientologists in Germany and the treatment of Jews in 1930s' Nazi Germany. The letter was signed by Dustin Hoffman, Goldie Hawn and a number of other Hollywood celebrities and executives.

Commenting on the matter, a spokesman for the U.S. Department of State said that Scientologists were discriminated against in Germany, but condemned the comparisons to the Nazis' treatment of Jews as extremely inappropriate, as did a United Nations Special Rapporteur. Based on the IRS exemptions, the U.S. State Department formally criticized Germany for discriminating against Scientologists and began to note Scientologists' complaints of harassment in its annual human rights reports, as well as the annual International Religious Freedom Reports it has released from 1999 onwards. Germany will continue to monitor Scientology's activities in the country, despite continued objection from Scientology which cites such monitoring as abuse of freedom of religion.

France and Belgium have not recognized Scientology as a religion, and Stephen A. Kent, writing in 2001, noted that recognition had not been obtained in Ireland, Luxembourg, Israel or Mexico either. Although the Belgian State Prosecution Service recommended that various individuals and organizations associated with Scientology should be prosecuted, the Belgian courts finally decided in March 2016 that Scientology is not a criminal organization.

In Greece, Scientology is not recognized as a religion by the Greek government, and multiple applications for religious status have been denied, notably in 2000 and 2003.

In the Netherlands, Scientology was granted tax exempt status in October 2013. The status was revoked in October 2015. The court ruled that because auditing fees and course costs were more expensive than most commercial education institutions, Scientology appeared to be aimed at making a profit.

The Church of Scientology maintains strict control over the use of its symbols, icons, and names. It claims copyright and trademark over its "Scientology cross", and its lawyers have threatened lawsuits against individuals and organizations who have published the image in books and on Web sites. The Church of Scientology seeks to make it very difficult for individual groups to attempt to publicly practice Scientology on their own, independent of the official Church of Scientology. Scientology has filed suit against a number of individuals who have attempted to set up their own auditing practices, using copyright and trademark law to shut these groups down.

The Church of Scientology and its many related organizations have amassed considerable real estate holdings worldwide, likely in the hundreds of millions of dollars. Scientology encourages existing members to "sell" Scientology to others by paying a commission to those who recruit new members. Scientology franchises, or missions, must pay the Church of Scientology roughly 10% of their gross income. On that basis, it is likened to a pyramid selling scheme. While introductory courses do not cost much, courses at the higher levels may cost several thousand dollars each.

In November 2009, Australian Senator Nick Xenophon used a speech in Federal Parliament to allege that the Church of Scientology is a criminal organization. Based on letters from former followers, he said that there were "allegations of forced imprisonment, coerced abortions, and embezzlement of church funds, of physical violence and intimidation, blackmail and the widespread and deliberate abuse of information obtained by the organization".

See also
Sociological classifications of religious movements
Scientology and other religions
New religious movement
Religion
Sect
Cult

References

 
Scientology and law

fr:Scientologie#Obtention de statut religieux
fr:Scientologie#Statut religieux et risque sectaire